John Stanley (1883–1921) was an English footballer who played in the Football League for Bolton Wanderers and Wolverhampton Wanderers.

References

1883 births
1921 deaths
English footballers
Association football defenders
English Football League players
Wolverhampton Wanderers F.C. players
Bolton Wanderers F.C. players
Crewe Alexandra F.C. players